Pycnota is a genus of beetles belonging to the family Staphylinidae.

The species of this genus are found in Europe.

Species:
 Pycnota aleocharaesimilis (Scheerpeltz, 1972) 
 Pycnota fuegina Pace, 1999

References

Staphylinidae
Staphylinidae genera